Military bases on the island of Cyprus:
Andreas Papandreou AFB
Evangelos Florakis Naval Base
RAF Akrotiri
Dhekelia Cantonment

References